Phone Bhoot is a 2022 Indian Hindi-language supernatural comedy film directed by Gurmmeet Singh and produced by Farhan Akhtar and Ritesh Sidhwani under the banner of Excel Entertainment. The film stars Katrina Kaif, Ishaan Khattar, and Siddhant Chaturvedi and Jackie Shroff. It was released theatrically on 4 November 2022 to mixed response from the critics.

Plot 
Major and Gullu are two unemployed young men who aspire of becoming exorcists. They always pray to their close friend 'Raaka', a statue, to help them alleviate their poverty. They decide to host a ghost Halloween party. At midnight, Raaka's glowing eyes shut down. In the process of mending it, Major and Gullu are electrocuted and enter the realm of dead, where they meet Ragini, a benevolent ghost who promises to help them achieve their dream in return for a favour. Major and Gullu agree to the deal. The deal is to help attain moksha (salvation) for depraved souls by exposing the criminals who'd wronged them in life. In return, Ragini will help Major and Gullu earn money.
   
Inspired by her, the duo start a "Phone Bhoot" company and she helps them. Their business eventually grows and attains fame. Atmaram, an evil tantrik becomes jealous as Phone Bhoot is destroying his bussiness and tries to destroy them but his efforts are thwarted by Ragini. Atmaram learns that Ragini is none other than the deceased lover of the late king Raja Dushyant Singh. Both were murdered in a car crash that was orchestrated by Atmaram himself in order to end Dushyant's reign as king. In the present, Atmaram captures Ragini in a bottle during the lunar eclipse when Ragini's powers are weakest. Major and Gullu feel deceived, realizing that Ragini manipulated them to seek revenge on Atmaram. Dushyant's soul is now held captive by Atmaram in his treasury of magic bottles.

The duo is confronted by another benevolent ghost that they'd previously helped with Ragini. This ghost reveals that Ragini is in dire trouble and requires their help in order to free many souls from Atmaram, including Dushyant's. Major and Gullu has a change of heart and confront Atmaram's, soon they are joined by their now animated Raaka, and free Ragini. Later other souls they have helped, liberated or helped attend salvation join them too in defeating Atmaram and throw him into the underworld's hellfire. Dushyant is now free. Ragini and Dushyant reunite in their metaphysical form and assure Major and Gullu that they'll help whenever it is needed.

Cast 
 Katrina Kaif as Ragini Maheshwari
 Ishaan Khatter as Galileo Parthasarthy aka Gullu
 Siddhant Chaturvedi as Sherdil Shergill aka Major
 Naufal Azmir Khan as Raghu Jadhav
 Jackie Shroff as Atmaram Dhyani
 Sheeba Chadha as Chikni Chudail
 Nidhi Bisht as Lady Diana (Daayan)
 Anuksha Suguna Pushparaj as Lavanya
 Manu Rishi Chadha
 Armaan Ralhan as Dushyant Singh
 Pulkit Samrat as Hunny (cameo) 
 Varun Sharma as Choocha (cameo) 
 Manjot Singh as Lali (cameo) 
 Manuj Sharma as Rahu
 Shrikant verma as Ketu
 Mohit Thakur as Jonny Dushman

Soundtrack 

The first song "Kinna Sona" released on 13 October 2022. Sung by Tanishk Bagchi and Zahrah S Khan. Lyrics and composed by Bagchi.

The second song "Kaali Teri Gut" released on 18 October 2022. Sung by Romy and Sakshi Holkar. Composed by Roy and lyrics by Kumaar.

The other songs was released as album on 18 October 2022. Third song "Phone Bhoot Theme" official video was released on 31 October 2022.

Production 
The principal photography commenced on 12 December 2020 in Mumbai.

Reception 
Phone Bhoot received mixed reviews from critics. Rachana Dubey of The Times of India rated the film 3.5 out of 5 stars and wrote "Gurmmeet Singh puts out a unique horror comedy which is a departure from most material one has seen in the year so far. For that itself this one deserves a visit to the theatre". Nairita Mukherjee of India Today rated the film 3.5 out of 5 stars and wrote "Phone Bhoot is heavily dependent on Katrina Kaif and she honestly does her best to pull the film. Where she fails, the makers have strategically placed Ishaan and Siddhant, both known for their spunky comic timing, to add a redbull boost". Devesh Sharma of Filmfare rated the film 3 out of 5 stars and wrote "Phone Bhoot is perhaps the silliest horror comedy you"ll ever see". Bollywood Hungama rated the film 3 out of 5 stars and wrote "Phone Bhoot has a fine first half with all the ingredients of a youthful, fun horror comedy. However, the second half could have been better. At the box office, the film will appeal to an audience who love horror comedies". Soumyabrata Gupta of Times Now rated the film 3 out of 5 stars and wrote "Phone Bhoot is a trippy horror ride which could have done better with a few more episodes on the chopping block. Saibal Chatterjee of NDTV rated the film 2.5 out of 5 stars and wrote "Phone Booth isn't an earth-shattering, game-changing deal for the genre but it has the feel of a full-on mad hatters' party where everything goes". Pratikshya Mishra of The Quint rated the film 2.5 out of 5 stars and wrote "The film’s own, original comedy, rarely works except when stars like Jackie Shroff and Sheeba Chaddha are at work". Sukanya Verma of Rediff rated the film 2.5 out of 5 stars and wrote "Phone Bhoot would be a lot more memorable if it wasn't merely a costume ball doffing its hat at Hollywood, Bollywood, Fukrey, Thalaivaa, a heroine who drinks mango juice like few can or a hero who can't stop playing his flute". Sanyukta Thakare of Mashable rated the film 2.5 out of 5 stars and wrote "Phone Bhoot isn't the perfect choice, but it is worth a watch for a chill-out session when you are tipsy with your friends".

References

External links  

 Phone Bhoot at Bollywood Hungama

2020s Hindi-language films
Indian comedy horror films
2022 films
Indian ghost films
Films scored by Mikey McCleary